Liam Underwood (born 3 June 1991 in Toronto, Ontario) is a rugby union fly-half who plays for Ontario Blues and  Canada.
Underwood made his debut for Canada in 2013 and was part of the Canada squad at the 2015 Rugby World Cup.

References

External links

1991 births
Canada international rugby union players
Canadian rugby union players
Living people
Sportspeople from Toronto
Rugby union fly-halves